The 2013 Atlantic 10 Men's Soccer Tournament was the eighteenth edition of the tournament. Held from Nov. 14-17, it determined the Atlantic 10 Conference's automatic berth into the 2013 NCAA Division I Men's Soccer Championship. The George Mason Patriots defeated the defending champions, the Saint Louis Billikens in the final, thus advancing to the NCAA Tournament for the first time since 2008.

The tournament was hosted by the University of Dayton and all matches were contested at Baujan Field.

Qualification 

The top eight teams in the Atlantic 10 Conference based on their conference regular season records qualified for the tournament. The top seeded teams included George Mason, Saint Louis, VCU and La Salle.

Bracket

Schedule

Quarterfinals

Semifinals

A-10 Championship

Statistical leaders

See also 
 Atlantic 10 Conference
 2013 Atlantic 10 Conference men's soccer season
 2013 NCAA Division I men's soccer season
 2013 NCAA Division I Men's Soccer Championship

Atlantic 10 Men's Soccer Tournament
Atlantic 10 Men's Soccer Tournament
Atlantic 10 Men's Soccer Tournament